Clear Lake is a brackish harbor located near Houston, Texas, U.S., in Harris County. The lake feeds Galveston Bay. It is bordered by Houston (Clear Lake City), Pasadena, League City, Clear Lake Shores, Taylor Lake Village, Seabrook and El Lago, Texas. NASA's Johnson Space Center lies near its shores.

The lake is a major recreation center and home to one of the largest concentrations of recreational boats and marinas in the nation. The communities surrounding the lake, known collectively as the Clear Lake Area, contain a large base of tourism and high-tech businesses.

References

Bodies of water of Harris County, Texas
Greater Houston
Geography of Houston
Galveston Bay Area
Tourist attractions in Harris County, Texas
Lakes of Texas